Rubia cordifolia, often known as common madder or Indian madder, is a species of flowering plant in the coffee family, Rubiaceae. It has been cultivated for a red pigment derived from roots.

Common names of this plant include manjistha in Sanskrit, Marathi, Kannada and Bengali, majith in Hindi and Gujarati, བཙོད་ in Tibetan, tamaralli in Telugu, manditti in Tamil.

Description
It can grow to 1.5 m in height. The evergreen leaves are 5–10 cm long and 2–3 cm broad, produced in whorls of 4-7 starlike around the central stem. It climbs with tiny hooks at the leaves and stems. The flowers are small (3–5 mm across), with five pale yellow petals, in dense racemes, and appear from June to August, followed by small (4–6 mm diameter) red to black berries. The roots can be over 1 m long, up to 12 mm thick. It prefers loamy soils with a constant level of moisture. Madders are used as food plants for the larvae of some Lepidoptera species including Hummingbird hawk moth.

Uses
Rubia cordifolia was an economically important source of a red pigment in many regions of Asia, Europe and Africa. It was extensively cultivated from antiquity until the mid nineteenth century.
The plant's roots contain an anthraquinone called purpurin (1,2,4-Trihydroxyanthraquinone) that gives its red colour as a textile dye  It was also used as a colourant, especially for paint, that is referred to as Madder lake.
The substance was also derived other species; Rubia tinctorum, also widely cultivated, and the Asiatic species Rubia argyi (H. Léveillé & Vaniot) H. Hara ex Lauener [synonym = Rubia akane Nakai, based on the Japanese Aka (アカ or あか) = red, and ne (ネ or ね) = root]. The invention of a synthesized duplicate, an anthracene compound called alizarin, greatly reduced demand for the natural derivative.

The roots of Rubia cordifolia are also the source of a medicine used in Ayurveda; this is commonly known in Ayurvedic Sanskrit as Manjistha (or Manjista or Manjishta) and the commercial product in Hindi as Manjith.

It is known as btsod in Traditional Tibetan Medicine where it is used to treat blood disorders; spread heat, excess heat in the lungs, kidneys, and intestines; reduce swelling; and is a component of the three reds, a subcompound included in many Tibetan preparations in order to remove excess heat in the blood.

In Traditional Chinese Medicine it is known as qiàn cǎo gēn (茜草根).

Pharmacologic properties
The following properties were described in various cellular and animal models:

 anti-inflammatory
 urolithiasis
 immunomodulatory

References

7 Joharapurkar A.A., ZAMBAD, S.P., WANJARI, M.M., UMATHE, S.N. "IN VIVO EVALUATION OF ANTIOXIDANT ACTIVITY OF ALCOHOLIC EXTRACT OF RUBIA CORDIFOLIA LINN. AND ITS INFLUENCE ON ETHANOL-INDUCED IMMUNOSUPPRESSION" "Indian Journal of Pharmacology" 2003; 35: 232-236

External links
 Contains a detailed monograph on Rubia cordifolia (Manjishta) as well as a discussion of health benefits and usage in clinical practice. Available online at https://web.archive.org/web/20110616193446/http://www.toddcaldecott.com/index.php/herbs/learning-herbs/306-manjishta

cordifolia
Plant dyes
Plants used in Ayurveda